Yuxarı Qarxun (also, Yukhary-Karkhun) is a village and municipality in the Yevlakh Rayon of Azerbaijan.  It has a population of 1,691.

References 

Populated places in Yevlakh District